Broad Street Park can refer to:

 Broad Street Park (Richmond, Virginia), a stadium located in Richmond, Virginia that stood from 1897 to 1916
 A town square in Claremont, New Hampshire
 A park in Greenwood, Mississippi
 A neighborhood in Hamilton Township, Mercer County, New Jersey